Sector 7 is a wordless picture book created and illustrated by David Wiesner. Published in 1999 by Clarion Books, it was the recipient of the Caldecott Honor for illustration in 2000.

Summary

The story is set at the Empire State Building's observatory, where a class of school children are on a field trip. The primary character is a boy befriended by a cloud who is whisked away to Sector 7, the depot for clouds. There the boy produces blueprints of fantastic new designs, in the form of ocean creatures, for the disgruntled group of young clouds. As the young clouds experiment, they delight in their new forms.

The adult clouds running the cloud depot are furious when they discover the young clouds' misbehavior, and they escort the boy back to the observatory. However, once the blueprints are examined further by the adults, they begin to admire the possibilities contained within them. As the children return home on the school bus, the New York skyline becomes filled with a profusion of clouds in the shapes of aquarium fish and ocean creatures.

Planned film adaptation
In May 2000, Nickelodeon won a bidding war against Pixar in acquiring the film rights to the novel Sector 7 with Darren Aronofsky attached to direct and Good Machine as co-producer. As of April 2019, the project remains in development hell.

References

American picture books
Children's fiction books
1999 children's books
Caldecott Honor-winning works
Empire State Building in fiction
Wordless books
Clarion Books books